Amphidiscella hosiei is a species of glass sponge in the family Euplectellidae, first found in the Perth Canyon at a depth of 695 m, off the Western Australian coast.

References

Hexactinellida
Animals described in 2019
Taxa named by Jane Fromont